Port Baku Towers are high-rise office buildings in Baku situated on Neftchilar Avenue next to marine port. The high-rise complex includes two towers - Northern and Southern - with 14 and 32 storey accordingly.

Architecture 
Architectural style of the buildings is modern.
The tallest tower has been built in a shape of triangular prism with lower and upper bases. Due to such a geometry, The Southern Tower presents multiple aspects to the view depending on the angle of viewing: it looks like flat rectangle from eastern and western part of the city, but from northern point tower's seen as a cylindrical building; lateral faces of construction meeting in the prism's edge are seen from the south of Baku. According to skyscrapernews.com, such shape of Southern Tower reminds Flatiron Building, New York's skyscraper built in the early 20th century. But in contrast to Flatiron Building, upper levels of Port Baku Southern Tower are gradually constricted toward the top, that creates convexity in midsection of building. Such a geometric solution allows to decrease number of beams in upper levels which makes cladding steady blue and provides high reflective characteristics in the daytime and crystal transparency at night.

Usage 
The buildings comprise class A offices, retail departments, international SPA and wellness centre, restaurants and cafes. There is also parking for 1200 cars.

Gallery

References

External links 
emporis.com
skyscraperpage.com

Buildings and structures in Baku
Skyscrapers in Azerbaijan
Shopping malls in Baku
Skyscraper office buildings
Retail buildings in Azerbaijan